Michael Ryan Pritchard (born May 4, 1972), better known by his stage name Mike Dirnt, is an American rock musician who is the co-founder, bassist, backing and occasional lead vocalist, and former guitarist of Green Day. He has also played in several other bands, including the Frustrators. His stage name Dirnt was originally a nickname that his friends from grade school gave him, as he constantly played "air bass/guitar" and made a "dirnt, dirnt, dirnt" noise while pretending to pluck the strings.

Early life 
As a child, his father was often away obtaining a degree, while his mother stayed at home to care for him and his sister Myla. Pritchard excelled in school, despite often missing classes as a result of various illnesses attributed to his biological mother's drug use. 

After an argument between his parents led to a call to the police, the couple divorced. His mother and sister moved to Rodeo, California, while he stayed in El Sobrante, California, with his father. However, missing his mother, he eventually moved in with her and Myla. Having been previously described as bright and fearless, Dirnt became sullen and withdrawn after the divorce.

In the cafeteria in Carquinez Middle School, ten-year-old Pritchard met Billie Joe Armstrong, with whom he bonded instantly. Armstrong began to play guitar with Mike, and the two spent much time together at Armstrong's house learning songs by artists such as the Ramones, Ozzy Osbourne, Def Leppard, Hüsker Dü, AC/DC, Lynyrd Skynyrd, the Replacements, the Who and Van Halen. At the age of 14, they formed a group named "Sweet Children" with Billie Joe singing and playing lead guitar, Mike playing rhythm guitar, Sean Hughes on bass, and Raj Punjabi on drums.

After attending Salesian High School, an all-boys Catholic school for his first year, Pritchard transferred to Pinole Valley High School, where Armstrong had also recently transferred from John Swett High School. Pritchard's family struggled with financial troubles; in an effort to help out, he worked as a chef at Nantucket, a seafood restaurant in Crockett. He eventually saved up enough money to purchase a used pickup truck that he and Armstrong often drove to Berkeley to attend shows at 924 Gilman Street, an influential DIY punk club. The pair got jobs at the club as security guards, despite their small physiques. Mike recalled, "We lived and died for that place. At that time, it meant everything."

Career 
While at Pinole Valley High School, Dirnt and classmate Armstrong formed a band called Sweet Children. Dirnt's mother struggled to provide for him and his sister as a single parent and eventually had to leave Rodeo in 1987 to look for work. Unwilling to leave Sweet Children, Armstrong and Dirnt convinced each other's parents to allow Dirnt to move into Armstrong's garage. 

After drummer John Kiffmeyer, who was also known as Al Sobrante, joined the group and replaced original drummer Raj Punjabi, Sweet Children began performing at 924 Gilman Street. The band performed several well-received sets, which encouraged Armstrong to drop out of high school to focus his energy on music. Dirnt, however, worried that he needed a backup plan and continued his studies. 

Bass player Sean Hughes, who was not as dedicated to the group as the other members, left Sweet Children, leaving Dirnt to play bass. Dirnt often brought his bass to school, and the plucking noise of the unamplified strings led classmates to jokingly call him by the onomatopoeia "Dirnt". After changing its name to Green Day, the band recorded its debut album 39/Smooth over the 1989 Christmas holiday break and went on its first van tour in June 1990, leaving the day that Dirnt graduated from high school.

At Woodstock '94, Green Day started an infamous mud fight, during which several fans invaded the stage. Overwhelmed by the chaotic situation, concert security mistook the mud-soaked Dirnt for a fan and tackled him, knocking out one of his teeth. Dirnt required emergency orthodontia due to this incident.

While performing at the 1998 KROQ Weenie Roast in Irvine, California, Third Eye Blind bassist Arion Salazar ran onstage and "bear-hugged" Dirnt, who was caught off-guard. The incident escalated into an on-stage scuffle before security escorted Salazar away. After the performance, Dirnt confronted Salazar backstage, and as the two argued, a beer bottle struck Dirnt in the head, causing a small fracture in his skull. Eyewitnesses later attributed the bottle-throwing to a fan of Third Eye Blind, though this was disputed by another eyewitness on the following day's Loveline broadcast. Salazar and the band's management soon released a statement: "I am sorry that my attempt at doing something I thought would be funny escalated into Mike getting hurt. That was never my intention. I simply had too much to drink and made a very bad decision. If I had been in Mike's place, I am sure I would have acted similarly. My heart goes out to him and I hope he recovers quickly."

Dirnt helped form the secret Green Day side project The Network during the summer of 2003. The six-piece new wave band consists of the members of Green Day, along with touring members and friends of the band. They released their debut album Money Money 2020 on September 30, 2003. After a seventeen-year hiatus, the band released their second album, Money Money 2020 Part II: We Told Ya So!, on December 4, 2020. In addition to playing bass for the band, Dirnt also provides lead vocals on many of their tracks (in contrast to his work with Green Day, where he primarily provides backing vocals).

In the live album, Bullet in a Bible, Armstrong calls Dirnt "the best bass player in the history of punk rock".

In 2007, during the recording of Green Day's eighth studio album 21st Century Breakdown, Dirnt, Armstrong, and drummer Tré Cool formed the garage rock side project, Foxboro Hot Tubs. In addition to the three members of Green Day, the band also includes Green Day touring members Jason White, Jason Freese and Kevin Preston. They released their debut album Stop Drop and Roll!!! in 2008. Dirnt played bass and provided backup vocals on the album.

In 2012, during the iHeartRadio Music Festival, Dirnt and Armstrong smashed their respective bass and guitar after Armstrong became agitated onstage and ranted about Green Day's set being cut short for Usher.

On April 18, 2015, Dirnt and his Green Day bandmates were inducted into the Rock and Roll Hall of Fame in their first year of eligibility.

Songwriting and lead vocals 

Although Armstrong is Green Day's main lyricist, Dirnt has written lyrics for "Emenius Sleepus", "J.A.R. (Jason Andrew Relva)", "Scumbag", "Ha Ha You're Dead", the subtrack "Nobody Likes You" from the medley "Homecoming" and the b-side "Governator", He also co-wrote the lyrics to "Best Thing in Town", "The One I Want", and "Panic Song" with Armstrong, and writes all the bass lines for Green Day songs. Mike also composed the intro to "Desensitized" from Shenanigans using a baseball bat and an old cathode ray tube television.

Dirnt sings lead vocals on "Governator", part of the third verse of "Outsider" on the Shenanigans album, the "Nobody Likes You" subtrack of "Homecoming". He also sings the subtrack "Modern World" from the medley "American Eulogy" from 21st Century Breakdown and sings lead for exactly 10 seconds in "Sex, Drugs, and Violence" from ¡Tré!.

For the Green Day side project The Network, Dirnt shares lead vocal duties with Armstrong. Some notable tracks that feature Dirnt as the lead vocalist include "Joe Robot", "Reto", "Money Money 2020", "Trans Am", and "Digital Black".

Personal life 
Dirnt married his first wife, Anastasia Serman, in 1996; they divorced in 1999. Anastasia and Dirnt had a daughter together, Estelle Desiree, who was born on December 20, 1996. He won full custody of his daughter in the summer of 2008 and took her to live in Oakland.

In 2004, he married girlfriend Sarah Garrity in a private villa in Puerto Vallarta, Mexico. The two divorced that same year.

On March 14, 2009, he married Brittney Cade in a private ceremony in Brittney's hometown of Ojai, California. Dirnt has two children with Cade: a son, Brixton Michael (born October 11, 2008), and a daughter, Ryan Ruby Mae (born November 29, 2010).

Dirnt is a Star Wars fan; he stated jokingly in an interview that he bases "most of his religious beliefs" on Star Wars. His birthday is on Star Wars Day. Dirnt's favorite bass player was Cliff Burton. He is a part owner of Rudy's Can't Fail Cafe, a diner in Emeryville and Oakland. The diner was named after a song by punk rock band the Clash, "Rudie Can't Fail", from their album London Calling. The menu item names are loosely based on punk themes such as "God Save the Chicken", a reference to "God Save the Queen" by the Sex Pistols, and "Give 'Em Enough Meatloaf", a reference to Give 'Em Enough Rope by the Clash.

Dirnt was adopted; his biological mother died on January 9, 2013. Dirnt only managed to meet her one month before her death.

In July 2014, it was announced that Dirnt would co-produce the Indie film Crickets, with Green Day manager, Pat Magnarella.

In December 2015, Dirnt along with Billie Joe Armstrong announced that they would launch a coffee company, Oakland Coffee Works. The company sells organic coffee beans and is the first company to exclusively use 100% compostable bags and pods.

In 2020 during the COVID-19 pandemic Armstrong noted that Dirnt is "basically becoming a farmer".

Discography

Green Day 

 39/Smooth (1990) – bass guitar, backing vocals
 Kerplunk! (1991) – bass guitar, backing vocals
 Dookie (1994) – bass guitar, backing vocals
 Insomniac (1995) – bass guitar, backing vocals
 Nimrod (1997) – bass guitar, backing vocals, baseball bat (as written in the album's liner notes)
 Warning (2000) – bass guitar, backing vocals, farfisa on "Misery"
 American Idiot (2004) – bass guitar, backing vocals, lead vocals on "Nobody Likes You" and the non-album track "Governator"
 21st Century Breakdown (2009) – bass guitar, backing vocals, lead vocals on "Modern World"
 ¡Uno! ¡Dos! ¡Tré! Trilogy (2012) – bass guitar, backing vocals and lead vocals on part of "Sex, Drugs and Violence"
 Revolution Radio (2016) – bass guitar, backing vocals
 Father of All Motherfuckers (2020) – bass guitar, backing vocals

Foxboro Hot Tubs 
 Stop Drop and Roll!!! (2008) – bass guitar, vocals

The Network 
 Money Money 2020 (2003) – lead vocals, bass guitar, backing vocals (as Van Gough)
 Money Money 2020 Part II: We Told Ya So! (2020) – lead vocals, bass guitar, backing vocals (as Van Gough)

The Frustrators 
 Bored in the USA (EP) (2000) – bass guitar, backing vocals
 Achtung Jackass (2002) – bass guitar, backing vocals
 Griller (EP) (2011) – bass guitar, backing vocals

Screeching Weasel 
 How to Make Enemies and Irritate People (1994) – bass, backing vocals
 "Suzanne Is Getting Married" (single) (1994) – bass and backing vocals on track 1

Squirtgun 
 Squirtgun (1995) – bass and backing vocals on "Make It Up"

Other media appearances 
 King of the Hill – (TV series – 1997) – teenager
 Riding in Vans with Boys (film – 2003) – himself
 Live Freaky! Die Freaky! (film – 2006)
 The Simpsons Movie (film – 2007) – himself
 Heart Like a Hand Grenade (film – 2008) – himself
 Green Day: Rock Band (video game – 2010) – himself (Voice, likeness, and archive footage)
 ¡Cuatro! (film – 2013) as himself
 Broadway Idiot (film – 2013) as himself

References

External links 

 
 Mike Dirnt at AllMovie
 Mike Dirnt Road Worn Precision Bass by Fender

1972 births
Living people
Alternative rock bass guitarists
Alternative rock singers
American adoptees
American alternative rock musicians
American male singers
American punk rock bass guitarists
American male bass guitarists
American punk rock guitarists
Green Day members
Musicians from Berkeley, California
Musicians from Oakland, California
People from Rodeo, California
Guitarists from California
Screeching Weasel members
21st-century American singers
21st-century American bass guitarists
20th-century American bass guitarists
Reprise Records artists
Adeline Records artists